Väsa (Elfdalian: Wesa) is a small village, about 5 km south from the Älvdalen Municipality in Dalarna, Sweden. Wäsabergen is a ski slope to the south of Väsa.

Populated places in Dalarna County